Susan-Mary Grant (born 1962) is Professor of American History at Newcastle University.

She received her PhD from the University of London. Her PhD supervisor was Peter J. Parish. After several temporary academic appointments, she joined the faculty of Newcastle University in 1992. In 1993 Grant co-founded and is the current Chair of the association of British American Nineteenth Century Historians. She is on the editorial board of Nations and Nationalism. From 2005 to 2010 she was the editor of the American Nineteenth Century History journal. In 2007 she delivered the British Academy's Sarah Tryphena Phillips Lecture in American Literature and History.

In May 2016 Grant was part of the expert panel on BBC Radio 4's In Our Time episode on The Gettysburg Address and in March 2018 was on the panel for Tocqueville.

Publications

References 

1962 births
Living people
British women historians
Academics of Newcastle University